George Benjamin Thorneycroft (20 August 1791 – 28 April 1851) was a successful ironmaster and Tory supporter who became the first Mayor of Wolverhampton, after the Borough was incorporated, in 1848.

Iron and Steel
Thorneycroft moved to Leeds with his family and returned to Wolverhamton aged 18 with a basic knowledge of iron forging which allowed him to join an established iron works in Bilston. In partnership with his twin brother Edward he founded Shrubbery Ironworks in Wolverhampton in 1824. From an initial production of 10 tons of iron a week George used his experience to grow the business and was soon producing 700 tons a week of high quality iron. With skillful marketing he became a key supplier to the fast expanding railway companies. The business continued to grow, even after Thorneycroft's death, and made large profits from production of armour plating and shells during the Crimean War. Along with other businesses in the town the works suffered, during a slump in demand for iron, and closed in 1877.

Politics
An outspoken conservative, his growing stature saw his selection as the first Mayor of Wolverhampton after incorporation in 1848. He donated a silver gilt mace to the Corporation to mark his accession. A statue of Thorneycroft, by sculptor Thomas Thornycroft, now stands at the top of a staircase in the foyer of the old Town Hall.

Family

Thorneycroft was born in Tipton on 20 August 1791, where his parents ran the Three Furnaces public house. He married Eleanor Page of Moxley and lived with his family at Chapel Ash House (now Salisbury House), Tettenhall Road, Wolverhampton. The house now bears a commemorative blue plaque.

References

1791 births
1851 deaths
English ironmasters
Mayors of Wolverhampton
People from Wolverhampton
People of the Victorian era
Tory (British political party) politicians
Conservative Party (UK) politicians
19th-century English businesspeople